Richard Norton may refer to:

Politicians
 Richard Norton (fl.1414), British MP for Worcester 1414

 Richard Norton (died 1592) (1530–1592), English MP for Hampshire 1571,1572
 Richard Norton (MP for Petersfield) (c. 1552–1611), MP for Petersfield 1572
 Richard Norton of Southwick Park (1615–1691), British Parliamentary colonel in English Civil War; MP and Governor of Portsmouth
 Richard Henry Norton (1849–1918), American politician from Missouri
 Richard Norton, 8th Baron Grantley (born 1956), British politician and financier
 Sir Richard Norton, 1st Baronet (1582–1646), English politician

Others
 Richard Norton (justice) (died 1420), British justice
 Richard Norton (professor) (1872–1918), American archaeologist, head of the American Volunteer Motor Ambulance Corps during World War I
 Richard Norton (actor) (born 1950), Australian martial artist, action film star, and stuntman

 Richard Norton (priest) (died 1523), British archdeacon of Barnstaple
 Richard Norton (pilot) (1939–1998), American pilot, scientist, and explorer